"I Should've Called" is a song written and recorded by American country music artist Eddy Raven.  It was released in May 1981 as the first single from the album Desperate Dreams.  The song reached #13 on the Billboard Hot Country Singles & Tracks chart.

Chart performance

References

1981 singles
1981 songs
Eddy Raven songs
Songs written by Eddy Raven
Song recordings produced by Jimmy Bowen
Elektra Records singles